Trần Thị Nguyệt Thu is the former Spouse of President of Vietnam (de facto First Lady) during her husband Nguyễn Xuân Phúc's presidency from April 2021 to January 2023, when he resigned amid a series of corruption scandals. She was previously the Spouse of the Prime Minister during her husband's premiership from 2016 to 2021. She is known for her elegant fashion style, often wearing the traditional Vietnamese dress áo dài, and is occasionally dubbed the First Lady of Vietnam by the overseas Vietnamese press.

Biography

Spouse of the Prime Minister and President 

Since her husband's ascend to the premiership in 2016 and the presidency in 2021, Madame Thu has accompanied Mr. Phúc on various state visits and received many foreign dignitaries, including hosting first ladies and spouses of foreign heads of states. She is known for her fashion style, often wearing the traditional Vietnamese dress áo dài and matching its color to the necktie of her husband, which has become an internet sensation in Vietnam.

Family 
Madame Thu has two children with Mr. Phúc. Their son, Nguyễn Xuân Hiếu, is currently the Chief of the Central Office of the Vietnamese Youth Union. Their daughter, Nguyễn Thị Xuân Trang (born 1986), is a businesswoman and major shareholder of the Gateway International School in Hanoi. Ms. Trang is married to Vũ Chí Hùng, who is currently the Deputy Director of the General Department of Taxation at the Ministry of Finance of Vietnam.

Controversy 
Thu has attracted controversy due to her alleged ties to the Việt Á scandal involving bribery and overpricing of COVID-19 test kit, which is partially responsible for her husband's resignation. In his resignation address, former President Phúc denied any conspiracy theories insinuating that his wife was associated with the Việt Á scandal.Some dissident organizations have urged for her arrest, arguing that not prosecuting Thu would not reflect well on the anti-graft campaigns of General Secretary Nguyễn Phú Trọng. Others, like the Việt Nam Thời Báo, a dissident publication of the Independent Association of Vietnamese Journalists, disagreed and instead called on the Vietnam Women’s Union to protect the "dignity" of Thu, claiming that Thu was used as a scapegoat by the Central Propaganda Department of the Communist Party to discredit and force her husband into resignation.

References 

Living people
People from Quảng Nam province
21st-century Vietnamese women politicians
Year of birth missing (living people)
Spouses of Vietnamese leaders